Martin Grant Hawtree is a golf course architect who designed or altered such golf courses as Royal Birkdale and Les Aisses golf . Hawtree is currently working with Donald Trump to create Trump International Golf Links in Scotland. He is director and chief architect at Hawtree Limited which is a family owned nationally known golf course architecture company. He received his Doctor in Philosophy in 1975. He has been head of Hawtree Limited since 1985.

Previous and current projects 
Ballybunion Golf Club (Ireland)
Wynyard Golf Club (England)
Lahinch (Ireland)
Portmarnock (Ireland)
Royal Birkdale (England)
Sunningdale (England)
Tarandowah Golfers Club (Canada)
Turnberry (Scotland)
Old Course at St Andrews (Scotland) 
Aboyne Golf Club (Scotland)
Elisefarm Golf Club (Sweden)
Vallda Golf & Country Club (Sweden)
Lisbon Sports Club (Portugal)
Les Aisses Golf (France)
Rudding Park Golf Club (England)

External links
http://www.hawtree.co.uk/
https://web.archive.org/web/20090308012000/http://www.trumpgolfscotland.com/press_kit/press_kit.asp

Golf course architects
Living people
Year of birth missing (living people)